Vanitas is a 1650-1670 oil on canvas painting by Mattia Preti, now inventory number 9283 in the Uffizi in Florence, for which it was bought in 1951 from a private collection. Art historians diasgree on whether the painting is a fragment of a larger work or retains its original dimensions, as well as whether it is a general vanitas or depicts Mary Magdalene.

References

Paintings in the collection of the Uffizi
Paintings by Mattia Preti
1650s paintings
1660s paintings